Good Neighbor, also called The Killer Next Door (MIFED Title), is a 2001 thriller film with Billy Dee Williams, Danica McKellar, and Tobin Bell. This is also the directorial debut of Todd Turner.

Plot
A young woman discovers the fine line between paranoia and having your worst fears become real in this tale of terror. Molly Wright is a typical college student sharing a house off-campus with her friends. Between her criminology classes, trying to keep up with her homework, and working as a volunteer with a local church group, Molly is wearing herself to a frazzle, so many of her friends think her imagination is working overtime when she begins to wonder aloud if Geoffrey Martin, the eccentric artist who has moved into the house next door, might be a serial killer. Molly's friends have a hard time believing her, but Paul Davidson, a police detective, thinks something funny is going on in the neighborhood after a number of missing persons cases are reported. But can Paul build a case against the killer before Molly becomes his next victim?

Cast
 Billy Dee Williams as Sgt. Paul Davidson
 Danica McKellar as Molly Wright
 Tobin Bell as Geoffrey Martin
 Christine Horn as Rea pucker
 James Stephen Jones as Brad Farmer
 Moe Michaels as Levi (as Mohamed El Emam)
 Brian Bremer as Lt. Vandemeer
 Polly Craig as Sister Maya
 Amber Wallace as Young Molly
 Brandon O'Dell as	Danny
 Ron Clinton Smith as Brian
 Kelly Finley as Mother
 Lucinda Carmichael as Amy
 Bill Greeley as Sgt. Peter Warfield
 Jeffrey Charlton as Bailey Parks
 Kathy Simmons as Professor
 Jennifer Crumbley as Carla Richardson
 Chet Dixon as Barney
 A.J. Jerrick as Ben
 Hawn Sterling as Javier
 Nathan Farmer as Frat Boy
 Randall Taylor as	Officer 12
 Jon Huffman as Honus Balfore
 Syr Law as Deli (as Crystal Porter)
 Joan Glover as Brooklyn
 Charles Lawlor as Virgil

References

External links
 
 
 Pictures of the Movie

2000s American films
2000s English-language films
2001 films
2001 thriller films
American thriller films

de:Showdown am Adlerpaß